Kakuluwo curry, also known as Jaffna crab curry, is a traditional spicy Sri Lankan crab curry. The dish originated in the northern regions of Sri Lanka but is popular around the country, mostly in the seaboard areas where fish and other seafood are staple foods. The dish is served with rice, pittu or bread.

Preparation
The dish typically uses either blue swimmer or mud crabs, which are cleaned, removing the gills and fibrous membranes then broken into smaller portions. Onion, garlic, ginger, fenugreek seeds, curry leaves, cinnamon, chilli, turmeric, salt and coconut milk are mixed in a claypot and allowed to simmer over medium-low heat. The crab is then added, followed by the seed pods of the drumstick tree; the dish is allowed to continue to simmer until the crab cooks through.

Kakuluwo curry is normally eaten with pol sambol and rice.

See also
 Cuisine of Sri Lanka

References

External links
 How to make Sri Lankan Crab Curry

Sri Lankan seafood dishes
Sri Lankan curries
Seafood dishes